Arwyn Davies (born 8 April 1967) is a Welsh actor, best known for playing the character of Mark Jones since 1993 on the long-running Welsh-language soap Pobol y Cwm. Arwyn Davies's father was the Welsh comedian, actor, musician, singer, and composer Ryan Davies, who died when Arwyn was nine years old.

Davies was nominated for a BAFTA Cymru 'Best Actor' award in 1996.

In an episode of the 2019 S4C series, Adre, Nia Parry was shown around Davies' Cardiff home and recording studio.

References

External links
 

1967 births
Living people
Welsh male soap opera actors
Welsh male television actors
Welsh-speaking actors